Carl "Fuzzy" Van Horn was a Modified driver from Phillipsburg, New Jersey. He drove several cars including his own 71E and later the 2A.

Racing career
In his prime, he was one of the most successful dirt track drivers and drove in the NASCAR Winston Cup Series at Pocono Raceway in 1975. Van Horn was inducted in the Northeast Dirt Modified Hall of Fame in 2008 and the Eastern Press Motorsports Association in 2009.

Van Horn died on July 17, 2017.

Motorsports Career Results

NASCAR
(key) (Bold – Pole position awarded by qualifying time. Italics – Pole position earned by points standings or practice time. * – Most laps led.)

Winston Cup Series

References

External links

3 Wide Picture Vault
ralphcorwinphotos.com
ralphcorwinphotos.com

2017 deaths
People from Phillipsburg, New Jersey
Sportspeople from Warren County, New Jersey
NASCAR drivers
Racing drivers from New Jersey
1933 births